"Watching the Detectives" is a 1977 single by English singer-songwriter Elvis Costello. Inspired by the Clash and Bernard Herrmann, the song features a reggae beat and cynical lyrics.

Costello's fourth single overall, "Watching the Detectives" was his first hit single on any national chart, peaking at number 15 in the UK and also charting modestly in Canada, Australia and the United States. The song featured on Rolling Stone's 500 Greatest Songs of All Time at number 363.

Background
The song, with a lyric about a lover who would rather watch TV, sung over a simple reggae beat, was described by Rolling Stone as "a clever but furious burst of cynicism", and they also described the song as "indisputably classic". Allmusic'''s Mark Deming described the song: "a skeletal minor-key melody that slowly but effectively wound itself into a solid knot of fierce emotional tension, pushing the bitter lyrical atmosphere further into the darkness". Costello described how he wrote the song:

I was in my flat in the suburbs of London before I was a professional musician, and I'd been up for thirty-six hours. I was actually listening to another inductee's record, the Clash's first album. When I first put it on, I thought it was just terrible. Then I played it again and I liked it better. By the end, I stayed up all night listening to it on headphones, and I thought it was great. Then I wrote "Watching the Detectives".

Costello considers "Watching the Detectives" his favourite song from the first five years of his career. He later performed the song with a big band arrangement, which he admitted was "a desecration to people who love the tenseness of the original recording", but explained that "the story that's going on, and the musical allusions in the original arrangements, relate very much to the realization of this song as an orchestral piece using the film music feeling and the swing rhythms of '50s detective shows."

Recording and release
The single, produced by Nick Lowe, was recorded in May 1977.  The backing band on the song were Steve Goulding on drums and Andrew Bodnar on bass guitar, both from Graham Parker's band, The Rumour. Keyboard overdubs were added later by Steve Nason (later better-known as Steve Nieve). Costello recalled,Cash Box said that it has "a subtle reggae beat and a sinister James Bond/Secret Agent guitar."

"Watching the Detectives" was the first top 40 hit in the UK Singles Chart for Costello, reaching number 15 and spending a total of eleven weeks in the chart."Watchin' the Detectives", Official Charts It also charted in several other countries including Australia, where it reached number 35, and Canada, where it reached number 60. In the United States it reached number 108 on the Hot 100. 

The UK and US singles (released in October and November 1977 respectively) featured different B-sides.  The UK single was backed by two live tracks from an August 7 performance at the Nashville Club, and these live tracks were credited to Elvis Costello and the Attractions.  (This was the first appearance of The Attractions on a record; the A-side is billed solely to Costello.)

The US single is backed by "Alison", the lead track from Costello's second UK single.

The song was also used as the theme for the PBS program History Detectives.

Personnel
 Elvis Costello – vocals, guitar
 Andrew Bodnar – bass
 Steve Goulding – drums
 Steve Nieve – piano, organ

Track listing
UK Stiff Records release
Release date: October 1977
Format: 7"
Catalogue No.: BUY20 
"Watching the Detectives"
"Blame it on Cain (live)"
"Mystery Dance (live)"

US Columbia Records release
Release date: November 1977
Format: 7"
Catalogue No.: 3-10705
"Watching the Detectives"
"Alison"

Inclusion on albums
The song was not included on the original UK releases of either My Aim Is True, which preceded it, or This Year's Model, which followed in March 1978. It was, however, added to the US release of My Aim Is True (March 1978). Two live versions of "Watching the Detectives" from 1978 were released, one from 6 March on the Canadian promotional album Live at the El Mocambo, and another from 4 June on the Live at Hollywood High EP, which came with initial copies of the Armed Forces album (January 1979). A later live version was included in the Costello & Nieve box-set in 1996. A live medley of "Watching the Detectives" and "My Funny Valentine" recorded in Tokyo was included on the Cruel Smile album by Elvis Costello & the Impostors in 2002. The studio version was also included on several 'best of' compilations of Costello's work, including Ten Bloody Marys & Ten How's Your Fathers (1980, Stiff), The Best of Elvis Costello – The Man (1985, Telstar), Girls Girls Girls (1989, Demon), The Very Best of Elvis Costello and the Attractions (1994, Demon), and The Very Best of Elvis Costello (1999, Universal TV). It was also included on the Argentinian print of This Year's Model in 1978.

Cover versions
 Jazz singer Jenna Mammina covered the song on her debut album Under the Influence in 1999.
 Toto covered the song on Through the Looking Glass in 2002.
 The Henry Girls covered the song on their album December Moon'' in 2011.
 Duran Duran covered the song on their 1995 album Thank You.

References

External links
 

Elvis Costello songs
1977 songs
Reggae rock songs
Songs written by Elvis Costello
Song recordings produced by Nick Lowe
Stiff Records singles
Columbia Records singles
1977 singles